The Asian Trade District (ATD) is a neighborhood in Northwest Dallas, Texas (USA). The area is recognized as the city's Koreatown, and has been designated as a special district since 1999. Located at the crossroads of Harry Hines Boulevard and Royal Lane, the district has been home to numerous Asian-owned businesses, wholesale retailers, and restaurants since the 1980s. With the arrival of Royal Lane Station on the DART Green Line in 2010, the area has become increasingly connected to the metropolitan area. The ATD includes over 21 shopping centers with more than 300 retailers.

Three people were wounded in a shooting outside a Koreatown beauty parlor in May 2022. A suspect was arrested a few days later, and the shooting was thought to have racial overtones.

See also
Chinatown, Houston
East Chinatown, Houston
Richardson, Texas, DFW's Chinatown
Spring Branch, Houston, Houston's Koreatown

References

Ethnic enclaves in Texas
Neighborhoods in Northwest Dallas
Dallas County, Texas